The 1978 Toyota Women's Classic, was a women's tennis tournament played on outdoor grass courts at White City Stadium in Sydney in Australia. The event was part of the AA category of the 1979 Colgate Series. It was the 16th edition of the tournament and was held from 4 December through 10 December 1978. Fifth-seeded Dianne Fromholtz won the singles title and earned $15,000.

Winners

Singles
 Dianne Fromholtz defeated  Kerry Reid 6–1, 1–6, 6–4
It was Fromholtz' 1st title of the year and the 13th of her career.

Doubles
 Kerry Reid /  Wendy Turnbull defeated  Judy Chaloner /  Anne Hobbs 6–2, 4–6, 6–2

Prize money

Notes

References

External links
 Women's Tennis Association (WTA) tournament edition details
 International Tennis Federation (ITF) tournament edition details

Toyota Women's Classic
Toyota Women's Classic
Toyota Women's Classic 1978
Toyota Women's Classic
Tennis tournaments in Australia